Micraira is the only genus of tribe Micraireae in the grass family, native to Australia.

 Species

References

External links

Micrairoideae
Endemic flora of Australia
Grasses of Oceania
Poaceae genera